Charlotte County may refer to:

 Charlotte County, New Brunswick, Canada
 Charlotte County, Florida, United States 
 Charlotte County, Virginia, United States 
 Mecklenburg County, North Carolina, United States
 The former name of Washington County, New York, United States